McKenna Sean "Bear" Pascoe  (born February 23, 1986) is a former American football tight end. He was drafted by the San Francisco 49ers in the sixth round of the 2009 NFL Draft. He played college football at Fresno State.

Early life
Born and raised in Porterville, California, Pascoe is the son of Sean and Julie Pascoe. He is an accomplished team roper, which he learned to do on his family's ranch.  He attended Ducor Union Elementary school. With recognized athletic ability, he played quarterback at Granite Hills High School.  He ranked as offensive player of the year for the East Yosemite League and was also named to the All-Area team.

He was recruited by Fresno State coming out of high school.  His younger cousin is Vince Pascoe, who also played tight end for Fresno State.

College career
As a tight end at Fresno State, Pascoe tied the record for most touchdown receptions in a game, with three against Texas A&M in 2007. He also holds the school record for most field goal blocks in a career, with six.

Professional career

New York Giants
On December 4, 2009, he was promoted to the Giants active roster. He made his first career catch against the Washington Redskins for 9 yards in Week 15 of the 2009 NFL season. He was waived during final cuts on September 4, 2010. On September 5, 2010, the Giants re-signed Pascoe to the team's practice squad.

On September 14, 2010, Pascoe was signed from the practice squad to the active roster after Kevin Boss suffered a concussion during the 2010 season opener against the Carolina Panthers.

Pascoe caught his first career touchdown in the 2011-2012 season NFC Championship Game against the San Francisco 49ers who drafted him and released him. Rich Eisen later referenced to the play by comparing Pascoe with Rob Gronkowski. The New York Giants went on to win that game and advance to face the New England Patriots in Super Bowl XLVI. Jake Ballard was sidelined in the Super Bowl XLVI after he tore his anterior cruciate ligament in the fourth quarter, but Pascoe, mostly used as a blocking tight end, caught 4 passes for 33 yards, helping the Giants defeat the Patriots, 21–17.

Atlanta Falcons
After joining the Atlanta Falcons for a voluntary workout at the end of April 2014, Pascoe officially signed with them on May 1, 2014.

Chicago Bears
On April 23, 2015, Pascoe signed a one-year deal with the Chicago Bears. On September 5, 2015, he was released by the Bears.

Detroit Lions
Pascoe signed with the Detroit Lions on December 15, 2015.

New England Patriots
On July 27, 2016, Pascoe was signed by the New England Patriots. On August 22, 2016, Pascoe was released by the Patriots.

Statistics

References

External links
New York Giants bio
San Francisco 49ers bio

1986 births
Living people
American football tight ends
Atlanta Falcons players
Chicago Bears players
Detroit Lions players
Fresno State Bulldogs football players
New England Patriots players
New York Giants players
People from Porterville, California
Players of American football from California
San Francisco 49ers players
Sportspeople from Tulare County, California